Hurricane Isbell was the final hurricane to affect the United States during the 1964 season. The eleventh tropical storm and sixth hurricane of the season, Isbell developed from a dissipating cold front in the southwestern Caribbean on October 8. The depression initially remained disorganized as it track northwestward, but strengthened into Tropical Storm Isbell on October 13. Re-curving northeastward, Isbell quickly strengthened further and reached hurricane status by later that day. Late on October 13, Isbell made landfall in the Pinar del Río Province of Cuba. The storm continued strengthening and peaked as a Category 3 hurricane on the following day. Isbell moved northeastward and made landfall near Everglades, Florida, late on October 14. After reaching the Atlantic on the following day, the storm began to weaken. Isbell turned northward and continued weakening, before transitioning to an extratropical cyclone while located just offshore eastern North Carolina on October 16.

The storm produced strong winds throughout western Cuba. Hundreds of homes were destroyed, as were several tobacco warehouses. There was at least $20 million in damage and four deaths in Cuba, three of them caused by collapsing houses in the Guane area. Several tornadoes in Florida caused significant damage. Throughout the state, 1 house was destroyed, 33 were severely damaged, and 631 suffered minor impact. Additionally, 66 trailers were destroyed and 88 were inflicted with major damage. Three deaths occurred in the state, one due to a heart attack and two from drowning in Florida Keys when their shrimp boat sank. Because the storm weakened considerably, impact in North Carolina was generally minor. The storm also spawned at least nine tornadoes in the state, which demolished trailers and unroofed homes and other buildings in several communities. Damage throughout the United States totaled $10 million.

Meteorological history

Hurricane Isbell was first identified as a weak tropical disturbance on October 7, 1964 over the western Caribbean. Situated to the south of a diffuse trough, the system remained weak and relatively disorganized as it moved generally northwest near Honduras and Nicaragua. Despite the presence of an upper-level anticyclone, which promotes favorable outflow for tropical cyclones and aids in tropical cyclogenesis, a lack of distinct low-level inflow inhibited intensification. Additionally, an area of warm mid-tropospheric air was present within the cyclone. Though a disheveled system, it is analyzed to have become a tropical depression by 12:00 UTC on October 8. The following day, the depression skirted the eastern coast of Honduras. Operationally, it was not until October 10 that the Weather Bureau initiated advisories on the depression. Throughout October 11 and 12, the depression slowly executed a tight cyclonic loop over the northwestern Caribbean Sea. It finally organized into a tropical storm and was given the name Isbell by 00:00 UTC on October 13 after completing the loop and acquiring a north-northeast trajectory.

Throughout October 13, marked intensification of the cyclone occurred. Shortly thereafter, the storm made landfall in extreme western Cuba, near Guane, before emerging over the southeastern Gulf of Mexico. Isbell's brief stint over land did not hinder development, which continued unabated until 12:00 UTC on October 14 at which time it reached its maximum intensity. Additionally, its central pressure bottomed out at 964 mb (hPa; 28.47 inHg). Around this time, a new low-pressure area formed  to Isbell's northwest over the Gulf in response to a powerful cold-core low over the Mississippi Valley. The cyclonic flow of this second system brought cool, dry air from the north and circulated it into the hurricane. This in turn caused the storm to become asymmetric in structure with radar imagery indicating little to no reflectivity along the western periphery of the hurricane.

The degrading structure of Isbell resulted in some weakening as it accelerated toward Florida. Within five hours, the system cleared the Florida Peninsula and emerged over the western Atlantic Ocean north of West Palm Beach. The storm's passage over land resulted in notable weakening, though Isbell remained of hurricane-strength. During the afternoon of October 15, the low that had formed the previous day induced a northward turn of the cyclone and directed it toward North Carolina, a result of what is known as the Fujiwhara effect. Thereafter, the two systems began to intertwine as Isbell began transitioning into an extratropical cyclone; rapid weakening accompanied this phase. Isbell completed this process by 12:00 UTC on October 16 as it moved onshore near Morehead City, North Carolina. On October 17 the two non-tropical systems merged into a single storm over the Outer Banks. Isbell's remnants emerged back over the Atlantic Ocean on October 18 near the Delmarva Peninsula before accelerating northeast. The system was last noted on October 19 as it moved over Atlantic Canada.

Preparations

In Cuba, thousands were evacuated due to flooding lowlands. Advisories were broadcast and issued warning of the possibility of heavy rains and winds, isolated small hail, and possible isolated tornadoes in Florida from 21:00 UTC on October 14 to 02:00 UTC on October 15. Emergency preparations at Key West's weather office were made. In the morning hours of October 13, the office alerted city, county, and military officials. In the afternoon, they completed office preparations and scheduling. On October 14, the office requested radio stations to stay on the air and relayed hourly reports.

In North Carolina, some tidal flooding was also forecast. People were warned to tune to television and radio broadcasts. Owing to the continued northeastward movement of the storm, tides ultimately did not exceed  in South Carolina. Across coastal areas of North Carolina, alerts for severe thunderstorms, tornadoes, and high tides were raised; however, the storm greatly diminished before reaching shore and little damage materialized. Moderate rains along the lower Neuse River basin were expected to prolong flooding triggered by Hurricane Hilda and its remnants earlier in October. Small craft advisories were raised northward to Provincetown, Massachusetts, through October 18.

Impact

Cuba
Additionally, pressures at the city fell to 979 mbar (hPa). Heavy rains caused rivers to over-top their banks, forcing thousands of people to evacuate. Three fatalities occurred in Guane due to collapsing homes. A fourth fatality took place elsewhere in Cuba. Numerous homes were damaged or destroyed by the storm, with exact numbers unknown. The region's tobacco crop also sustained considerable losses with fields and warehouses destroyed. The damage to agriculture compounded economic losses in Cuba that resulted from Hurricane Flora in September 1963, which devastated the nation, as well as impacts from Hurricanes Cleo and Hilda earlier in 1964. The combined effects of Cleo, Hilda, and Isbell resulted in economic losses of approximately $100 million in the country, of which at least $20 million was directly attributed to Isbell.

Florida

Hurricane-force gusts were measured in Belle Glade, Fort Lauderdale, Key West, Pompano Beach, and West Palm Beach. Atmospheric pressures fell to 970.7 mb (hPa; 28.67 inHg) in the Dry Tortugas and 977.5 mb (hPa; 28.87 inHg) on the mainland in Juno Beach. Rainfall in the state was relatively limited owing to the brisk movement of the storm, though a frontal system immediately preceding the hurricane brought heavy rains to the state. No major storm surge was reported during Isbell's passage due to greatly weaker winds in the back half of the storm.

Throughout Florida, three people were killed in relation to the storm and no more than $10 million in damage occurred, with more than half of which was attributed to agricultural losses. In addition, 76 people were injured, 12 of whom required hospitalization. Structural damage was relatively limited, with only 63 homes and businesses, mostly trailers, being destroyed; 159 other structures sustained major damage while a further 631 experienced minor damage. The majority of damage from Isbell was not from the hurricane itself but rather tornadoes spawned by its outer bands. At least nine, and as many as twelve, tornadoes affected the state with the greatest effects being felt in the Miami metropolitan area. All storm-related injuries were attributed to these tornadoes as well as the majority of structural damage. According to the National Climatic Data Center, four of these tornadoes were of F2 intensity.

Despite the close passage of the storm to the Florida Keys, damage in the area was light and amounted to $175,000. Of this, $125,000 was attributed to structural damage. Hurricane-force winds in the archipelago only lasted 15 minutes and gale-force winds occurred over a 5-hour span. The brevity of damaging winds limited the effects of the storm. Most damage was constrained to downed trees, signs, and power poles. Two trailers were overturned, however, and an oil barge sank in the Key West Harbor. Two people drowned after their shrimp boat was destroyed. In and around the Fakahatchee Strand Preserve State Park, Royal Palms, and Royal Poincianas were defoliated by the hurricane's winds. Downed trees and power lines in Collier County temporarily left many customers without phone and electrical service. Residents in nearby Lee Cypress stated that the effects from Isbell were worse than Hurricane Donna which struck the region as a Category 4 in September 1960.

Palm Beach County was the most affected area, accounting for more than half of the losses, and approximately $700,000 in damage. One indirect death occurred when a man suffered a heart attack in Lake Worth while installing storm shutters. At least three tornadoes were spawned in Palm Beach County. The strongest was an F2 that struck a trailer park in Briny Breezes, damaging numerous trailers and injuring 22 people. Shortly thereafter the same tornado or possibly a second one struck Boynton Beach, injuring three people and damaging several structures. Another tornado in Boca Raton caused a number of minor injuries. In West Palm Beach, a twister that crossed the intersection of State Roads 802 and 809 damaged adjacent properties and injured several people. Throughout Palm Beach County, 492 homes suffered damage, while 36 mobile homes were demolished and 60 others were inflicted major impact. Additionally, 33 farm buildings and 9 small businesses were severely damaged or destroyed.

In Martin County, an F2 was spawned in Hobe Sound and affected the area near U.S. Route 1. About 39 homes and 13 mobile homes were damaged, while two farm buildings and two businesses also received impact. The fourth F2 tornado was spawned in Brevard County near Eau Gallie. It caused extensive damage and injured 17 people in the Orange Court trailer park. Collectively, 35 homes in Flagler and Volusia counties were damaged.

The Carolinas and elsewhere
 
Heavy rains associated with Isbell and a nearby non-tropical low resulted in heavy rains across The Carolinas on October 15 and 16. The cotton crop sustained the greatest losses during the event, with damage estimated in excess of $1 million. What little coastal flooding took place mostly resulted from wave run-up rather than tidal flooding. Some beach erosion occurred in exposed areas.

Much of North Carolina was affected by Isbell with rain extending into interior parts of the state. Some flash flooding took place in the Piedmont, though overall effects were minimal. In the Blue Ridge Mountains, the French Broad River topped its banks and prompted evacuations in Hot Springs and Marshall. The greatest impacts were felt along the Neuse River in Kinston within Lenoir County. Rains from Isbell exacerbated ongoing floods in the area, resulting in heavy damage to many homes. A man was swept away by swift currents near a Duke Energy steam plant in Cliffside; however, it is unknown if he perished or was later rescued. Losses to the peanut crop were extensive, though no monetary value is available. With the storm arriving at low-tide, no notable coastal flooding occurred.

Elsewhere along the East Coast, the remnants of Isbell produced generally light to moderate rain. A localized maximum of around  occurred in Massachusetts as the system began to dissipate. Immediately following the storm, an unseasonably strong cold front brought near-freezing temperatures to Virginia, resulting in frost. The combination of the cold air and the hurricane prevented any peanut bumper crop harvesting in the state.

See also

List of Florida hurricanes
Tropical Storm Barry (2007)
Hurricane Wilma
Hurricane Dennis (1981)
Hurricane Charley

References

External links
 (National Hurricane Center Summary)
 (NGLS Info)
 (NOAA summary)
 (Storm intensity archive)
 (MWR)

1964 Atlantic hurricane season
Hurricanes in Florida
Category 3 Atlantic hurricanes
1964 in Florida
1964 natural disasters in the United States